Circuit total limitation (CTL) is one of the present-day standards for electrical panels sold in the United States according to the National Electrical Code.  This standard requires an electrical panel to provide a physical mechanism to prevent installing more circuit breakers than it was designed for.  This has generally been implemented by restricting the use of tandem (duplex) breakers to replace standard single pole breakers.

Code Requirement
The 1965 edition of the NEC, article 384-15 was the first reference to the circuit total limitation of panelboards. , the location of this language is at Article 408.54 now titled "Maximum Number of Overcurrent Devices."
Non-CTL panels have not been made by reputable manufacturers since 1965. Though this may change due to the 2008 repeal.

Non-CTL for replacement only

Circuitboards and panelboards built prior to 1965 did not have circuit total limiting devices or features built-in.  To support these old panels, non-CTL circuit breakers that bypass the rejection feature are still sold "for replacement use only."  As a result, numerous unsafe situations have resulted where panels were dangerously overloaded because these non-CTL breakers continue to be used.  With the use of non-CTL breakers, panels can be configured with the total number of circuits in excess of the designed capacity of that panel.

The 2008 code did away with the previous 42 circuit limitation on panelboards. One can now order panelboards with as many as 84 circuit places, and a corresponding ampacity rating. If a panelboard with a sufficient number of breaker positions is installed in the first place, the need for non-CTL breakers should be eliminated.

In their 2019 catalog Eaton now specifies that their non-CTL breakers are "Suitable for use in plug-on neutral style loadcenters"  which negates the replacement only rule.

Gallery

See also
 National Electrical Code

References

External links 

 

Electrical engineering
Electrical wiring
Electric power distribution